Mahindra United Football Club (formerly known as Mahindra & Mahindra) was an Indian professional football club based in Mumbai, Maharashtra. Founded in 1962, the club competed in the I-League, then top tier of Indian football league system, before closing down at the end of 2009–10 season. Affiliated with the MFA, the club participated in both the National Football League, and MDFA Elite League.

Nicknamed "Jeepmen", the club was popularly referred as India's MU after the English Premier League powerhouse Manchester United. It was one of the most popular football clubs in the country and was known for its consistent good performance in the last four decades of its existence. The club had won many major tournaments in India, and also clinched an international tournament, 2003 POMIS Cup in the Maldives.

History

Formation and journey

The club was founded in 1962 as the Mahindra & Mahindra Allied Sports Club under the patronage of Mahindra Group. They secured admission into Bombay's Harwood League in 1964 and won the first title in 1970. Players like renowned goalkeeper E.N. Sudhir appeared with the club at that time. The club later lifted its first knock-out tournament, Bandodkar Gold Trophy in 1980. The club later became Durand Cup champion in 1998, under coaching of legendary football manager Syed Shahid Hakim, and went on to clinch the title again in 2001–02.

In leagues of Mumbai
Since their inception, Mahindra became a member of Western India Football Association (WIFA) and later in 1983, became affiliated with Mumbai District Football Association (formerly BDFA). They participated in later editions of Bombay Harwood League alongside Maharashtra Football League, and won the Harwood League four times in 1970, 1982, 1984 and 1985.

Mahindra later participated in W.I.F.A. Super Division from 1990 to 1999 and clinched WIFA title in 1995.

They later participated in MDFA Elite Division and lifted trophies consecutively from 2000 to 2004 and 2006 to 2009.

NFL and other domestic competitions
From 2002 to 2003, Czech coach Karel Stromšík managed club in the National Football League. In the summer of 2006, it was renamed to Mahindra United.  The shirt colour was also changed from orange to red.

Team played its NFL home matches at the Cooperage Ground in Mumbai, but due to the bad state of the stadium, as of February 7, 2006, they had to play almost all of their NFL games at away venues.

Mahindra were crowned champions of NFL Premier Division for the first time in club's history in the 2005–06 season, with two games to spare. They followed it up by beating their arch-rivals, Air India for the first time in the season. They are also two-time winners of the Indian Federation Cup, having won the title in 2003 and 2005. The win in 2005 ensured that Mahindra became the first club in the history of Indian football to win the Federation Cup and National Football League double in the same season.
They did however lose the NFL Super Cup to East Bengal by a margin of 1–2.

Later years
In the 2006 edition of IFA Shield, Mahindra United emerged as champions, defeating Mohun Bagan AC by 1–0 in Kolkata. They also participated in the 2006 Federation Cup and achieved third place, defeating Dempo SC 4–2 in the penalty-shootout. In the 2008 edition of IFA Shield, they defeated South African side Santos FC by 3–1 to win the title.

Head coach of the team was Derrick Pereira. Players like Subhashish Roy Chowdhury, Manjit Singh and Surojit Bose have been associated with the team. The club also tried forming under-15 and under-19 teams in order to nurture the young talent in the country.

Stadium

Mahindra United used the Cooperage Football Ground, located in Nariman Point, Mumbai, for its home matches of both the National Football League and I-League, alongside MDFA Elite League. It had a capacity of nearly 12,000 spectators.

Disbanding the club
In 2010, it was announced that club will be disbanded after the end of the 2009–10 I-League. The decision was a major blow for football in Mumbai, and financial reason was one of the main factors behind it. Alan Durante, the chairman of Mahindra United, who's been with the team since 1991 and under whom Mahindra have won almost everything in Indian football, said it wasn't about costs.

Ruzbeh Irani, executive vice-president of the club, said: “It was in line with our group’s philosophy and shift, from taking part in professional sport to developing it. We feel we can make much difference to sport in India at the school level in football, instead of running a professional team”.

Achievements

Overall
Mahindra United had won almost all the major competitions in India. It was the only team from Mumbai to win Durand Cup, the second oldest football competition in the world, twice. It was also the first team from Maharashtra to win the Harwood League and Nadkarni Cup three times in a row. The club has also been two times winner of IFA Shield and Federation Cup. There are several other championships like Mammen Mappillai Cup, Rovers Cup, Chief Minister's Cup and Super Cup where Mahindra United has registered victories.

On international level, Mahindra United achieved success through lifting the 2003 POMIS Cup trophy in the Maldives, beating Club Valencia 3–1. They also became the first Indian club to reach the quarter-finals of the 2007 AFC Cup, but their journey ended with an aggregate 4–5 defeat to Lebanese side Al-Najmeh SC.

Ranking
Mahindra United emerged as top ranked Indian team, and 464 universally, in the international rankings of clubs during the first ten years of the 21st century (2001–2010), issued by the International Federation of Football History & Statistics in 2011.

Honours

Invitational
POMIS Cup
Champions (1): 2003

Continental
AFC Cup
Quarter-final (1): 2007

Domestic

National Football League
Champions (1): 2005–06
Third place (2): 2003–04, 2006–07

Durand Cup
Champions (3): 1998, 2001–02, 2008
Runners-up (3): 1990, 2000, 2007
Federation Cup (India)
Champions (2): 2003, 2005
Runners-up (3): 1991, 1993, 2007
Indian Super Cup
Champions (1): 2003
Runners-up (1): 2006
IFA Shield
Champions (2): 2006, 2008
Rovers Cup
Champions (1): 1993
Runners-up (2): 1970–71, 1990
Mumbai Harwood League (MDFA Elite Division)
Champions (13): 1970, 1982, 1984, 1985, 1995, 2000, 2001, 2002, 2003, 2004, 2006–07, 2007–08, 2008–09
 Nadkarni Cup
Champions (3): 1986, 2001, 2002
Runners-up (4): 1968, 1971, 1974, 2005
Mammen Mappillai Trophy
Champions (1): 1999
Bandodkar Gold Trophy
Champions (1): 1980
Runners-up (1): 1988
Sait Nagjee Trophy
Runners-up (1): 1975

Others
Chief Ministers Cup
Champions (1): 1998

Performance in AFC competitions

AFC Cup: 3 appearances
2004: Group stage
2006: Group stage
2007: Quarter-finals

Continental record

Notable players
For all former or notable Mahindra United players with a Wikipedia article, see: Mahindra United FC players.

Foreign players
 Mohammed Monwar Hossain (1998–1999)
 Bassam Al-Khatib (1999–2000)
 Hari Khadka (2001)
 Felix Aboagye (2003–2004)
 Raphaël Patron Akakpo (2003–2005)
 Charles Asamoah (2004–2005)
 José Ramirez Barreto (2005–2006)
 Yusif Yakubu (2005–2008)
 Filipe Azevedo (2006–2007)
 Andrews Pomeyie Mensah (2006–2008)
 Caswain Mason (2007)
 Edson Dico Minga (2007)
 Douhou Pierre (2007–2009)
 Lamine Tamba (2007–2010)
 Bello Razaq (2008)

Final staff

Youth teams

Mahindra United under-19

In an attempt to nurture young talent and promote football in Mumbai, Mahindra United fielded an under-19 team from 2003. The team performed extremely well in the National Football League (Under-19) and reached the semi-finals, beating teams like Churchill Brothers and Salgaocar.

Mahindra United participated in I-league (Under-19), held since 2008.

Under-15 and 17

Spurred by the success of its U-19 team, Mahindra United fielded both U-15 and U-17 teams from 2006. The U-15 team played Manchester United Premier Cup Asian Qualifiers held at Kolkata, where top NFL clubs also participated.

Youth setup has also participated in the Manchester United Premier Cup in 2010.

Managerial history

 Syed Shahid Hakim (1998–1999)
 Harish Rao (1999–2000), (2001–2002)
 Shabbir Ali (2000–2001)
 Karel Stromšík (2002–2003)
 Dave Booth (2003–2004), (2009–2010)
 Syed Nayeemuddin (2004–2005)
 Derrick Pereira (2005–2009)

Other department

Field hockey
The club had its field hockey team that participated in both the Beighton Cup and Bombay Gold Cup.

Honours
Bombay Gold Cup
Runners-up (4): 1974, 1976, 1982, 1986
Guru Tegh Bahadur Gold Cup
Champions (1): 1980

See also

 Sports in Maharashtra
 List of football clubs in Mumbai
 Defunct football clubs in India

Notes

References

Further reading

External links
Mahindra United FC at Global Sports Archive
Mahindra United FC at WorldFootball
Mahindra United FC at flashscore.in

Association football clubs established in 1962
Association football clubs disestablished in 2010
Mahindra Group
Defunct football clubs in India
I-League clubs
Works association football clubs in India
1962 establishments in Maharashtra
2010 disestablishments in India
Sport in Maharashtra
Football clubs in Mumbai
Mahindra United FC